Eugene McGee may refer to:

 Eugene McGee (American football) (1882–1952), American lawyer and college football player and coach
 Eugene McGee (Gaelic football manager) (1941–2019), Irish Gaelic footballer and manager
 Eugene McGee, lawyer involved in a hit-and-run, see Kapunda Road Royal Commission